Richard Swineshead (also Suisset, Suiseth, etc.; fl. c. 1340 – 1354) was an English mathematician, logician, and natural philosopher. He was perhaps the greatest of the Oxford Calculators of Merton College, where he was a fellow certainly by 1344 and possibly by 1340. His magnum opus was a series of treatises known as the Liber calculationum ("Book of Calculations"), written c. 1350, which earned him the nickname of The Calculator.

Robert Burton (d. 1640) wrote in The Anatomy of Melancholy that "Scaliger and Cardan admire Suisset the calculator, qui pene modum excessit humani ingenii [whose talents were almost superhuman]".  Gottfried Leibniz wrote in a letter of 1714: "Il y a eu autrefois un Suisse, qui avoit mathématisé dans la Scholastique: ses Ouvrages sont peu connus; mais ce que j'en ai vu m'a paru profond et considérable."  ("There was once a Suisse, who did mathematics belonging to scholasticism; his works are little known, but what I have seen of them seemed to me profound and relevant.")  Leibniz even had a copy of one of Swineshead's treatises made from an edition in the Bibliothèque du Roi in Paris.

Notes

References 
 
 Molland, George (2004) "Swineshead, Richard", Oxford Dictionary of National Biography

14th-century English mathematicians
14th-century philosophers
14th-century Latin writers
English philosophers
Fellows of Merton College, Oxford
Scholastic philosophers
Medieval physicists
14th-century English writers